Air Defence College is premier training institute of Indian Air Force and is located at Air Force Station, Memaura. The college is the country's only centre imparting advance training to fighter controllers of the Air Force.

Establishment and initial years 
It was established in 1958 at Jodhpur as the Control & Reporting (C & R) School. The college trains fighter controllers of the Indian Air Force. It moved to Memaura in 1972. Control & Reporting (C & R) School was upgraded on March 15, 1980, and rechristened as the Air Defence College.

See also
 Indian National Defence University
 Military Academies in India
 Sainik school

References 

Indian Air Force
Military education and training in India
1958 establishments in Rajasthan
Educational institutions established in 1958